The 2022 Xfinity 500 was a NASCAR Cup Series race held on October 30, 2022, at Martinsville Speedway in Ridgeway, Virginia. Contested over 500 laps on the .526 mile (.847 km) short track, it was the 35th race of the 2022 NASCAR Cup Series season, the ninth race of the Playoffs, and final race of the Round of 8.

This race, won by Christopher Bell, was noted for Ross Chastain's "Hail Melon" finish, in which Chastain rode the wall in a move described as similar to those done in racing video games to secure a fourth-place finish that locked him to the Championship 4 race. Chastain's move also set an all-new track record.

Report

Background

Martinsville Speedway is an International Speedway Corporation-owned NASCAR stock car racing track located in Henry County, in Ridgeway, Virginia, just to the south of Martinsville. At  in length, it is the shortest track in the NASCAR Cup Series. The track is also one of the first paved oval tracks in NASCAR, being built in 1947 by H. Clay Earles. It is also the only race track that has been on the NASCAR circuit from its beginning in 1948. Along with this, Martinsville is the only NASCAR oval track on the entire NASCAR track circuit to have asphalt surfaces on the straightaways, then concrete to cover the turns.

Entry list
 (R) denotes rookie driver.
 (i) denotes driver who is ineligible for series driver points.

Practice

Practice results

Qualifying

Qualifying results

Race
Heading into the finish, Ross Chastain clinched his spot into the Championship 4 by the way of a last-ditch wall-ride that has been described as a "video game-like move" in the final lap. Chastain's move also set a new Cup Series lap record on the track at 18.845 seconds. The move has been dubbed the Hail Melon by many in the sport. Christopher Bell's race victory also placed him into the championship race, with Joey Logano (who won a race in the Round of 8) and Chase Elliott also advancing.

Stage Results

Stage One
Laps: 130

Stage Two
Laps: 130

Final Stage Results
Stage Three
Laps: 240

Race statistics
 Lead changes: 8 among 5 different drivers
 Cautions/Laps: 6 for 53
 Red flags: 0
 Time of race: 3 hours, 24 minutes and 18 seconds
 Average speed:

Media

Television
NBC Sports covered the race on the television side. Rick Allen, 1997 race winner Jeff Burton, Steve Letarte and 2014 race winner Dale Earnhardt Jr. called the race from the broadcast booth. He said it’s a video game move off of turn four. Dave Burns, Parker Kligerman, Marty Snider and Dillon Welch handled the pit road duties from pit lane.

Radio
MRN covered the radio call for the race, which was also simulcast on Sirius XM NASCAR Radio. Alex Hayden, Jeff Striegle and 7 time Martinsville winner Rusty Wallace had the call for MRN when the field raced down the front straightaway. Dave Moody covered the action for MRN when the field raced down the backstraightway into turn 3. Steve Post, Winston Kelley, Brienne Pedigo and Kim Coon covered the action for MRN from pit lane.

Standings after the race

Drivers' Championship standings

Manufacturers' Championship standings

Note: Only the first 16 positions are included for the driver standings.

Notes

References

Xfinity 500
Xfinity 500
NASCAR races at Martinsville Speedway
Xfinity 500